Governor Wolf may refer to:

Dale E. Wolf, 70th Governor of Delaware
George Wolf, 7th Governor of Pennsylvania
Tom Wolf, 47th Governor of Pennsylvania